Anđelko Tešan (born 21 November 1949 in Sarajevo, PR Bosnia-Herzegovina, FPR Yugoslavia) is a former Bosnian professional footballer.

Club career
He started his career with FK Sarajevo in 1967, and went on to represent the club for a further ten seasons. He also played for US teams New York Eagles and Columbia Ohio before retiring in 1981.

International career
He made his debut for Yugoslavia in a December 1968 friendly match away against Brazil and has earned a total of 11 caps, scoring no goals. His final international was an October 1970 friendly match against the Soviet Union.

References

External links

1949 births
Living people
Footballers from Sarajevo
Association football defenders
Yugoslav footballers
Yugoslavia international footballers
FK Sarajevo players
New York Eagles players
Yugoslav First League players
American Soccer League (1933–1983) players
Yugoslav expatriate footballers
Expatriate soccer players in the United States
Yugoslav expatriate sportspeople in the United States